Óliver Ramos (born March 28, 1989), better known as Tapir 590 or Quinientos Noventa, is a Peruvian Internet celebrity and phenomenon. He became known for his videos where he showed off his luxuries and his famous phrase "Claro pe', mascota".

Career 
Tapir 590 started uploading videos on his social networks around January 2019. His content was based on varied content, showing off his luxuries, owning expensive objects and giving "advice", provoking the derision of his followers. One of his first viral videos was "Cómo conquistar a una venezolana" ("How to conquer a Venezuelan [girl]"). Another reason why he became famous was for the phrase "Claro pe', mascota".

After the growth of his popularity, he was invited to TV shows such as El wasap de JB and El reventonazo de la chola, where he presented a cover of "Secreto" with Susy Díaz. He also launched as a reggaeton singer with her first single "Concha conchita", released in March 2019, and later performed covers of other songs. Likewise, ventured as an actor in short films.

In April 2019, he announced that he would stop uploading videos, due to the existence of accounts that used his name and profited from his followers. However, shortly after he would reappear and justified that he was busy doing radio and television works.

In his new stage, Tapir says that he chose to focus on his musical growth. Tapir accuses rapper Faraón Love Shady of "copying his ideas and style", which is why he put aside content creation.

Education 
Ramos claims to be a business administrator by profession. He studied three years at the Francisco Antonio de Zela Private Technological Institute in Tacna and four cycles at University of Tarapacá in Chile. He also studied music and took courses to be a bodyguard.

Reception and impact 
In 2022, the Peruvian newspaper La República included him in its list of the "most popular phrases of the last 10 years in Peru", for his phrase "Claro pe', mascota". This same phrase was interpolated in the ninth season of the television series Al fondo hay sitio, by the character Diego Montalbán (Giovanni Ciccia).

References 

Peruvian Internet celebrities
Peruvian comedians
People from Tacna
University of Tarapacá alumni
21st-century Peruvian male singers
21st-century Peruvian singers
Comedy musicians
Peruvian singer-songwriters
Living people
1989 births